Souris noire is a French television series which debuted 1987 on France 3. The series focuses on a teenage girl (played by Vanessa Guedj) who tries to solve different mysteries undercover as her alter ego "Black Mouse" (Souris Noire) and ends up experiencing all sorts of adventures.

External links

1987 French television series debuts
French children's television series
1980s French television series